The Ministry of Indigenous People, or Ministry of Native People, is a cabinet-level federal ministry in Brazil. The ministry was established on 11 January 2023 under the government of Luiz Inácio Lula da Silva to advance and protect the interests of the Indigenous people of Brazil.

Structure 
The priorities and structure of the Ministry are being elaborated in the Thematic Group of Indigenous People created during the transition, that contains, within its objectives, the nullification of the measures adopted by the Bolsonaro Government relative to the demarcation and use of indigenous territories.
The relationship between the new ministry, FUNAI and the Special Secretariat for Indigenous Health (SESAI) is yet to be established.

Leadership 
The current federal deputy Sônia Guajajara was announced, in late December, as the head of the agency.

See also 
 Genocide of indigenous peoples in Brazil
 Fundação Nacional do Índio (FUNAI)

Notes and references 

Indigenous politics in Brazil
Government ministries of Brazil
Indigenous rights in Brazil
Ministries established in 2023
2023 establishments in Brazil
Indigenous affairs ministries